Alcohol server training is a form of occupational education typically provided to servers, sellers and consumers of alcohol to prevent intoxication, drunk driving and underage drinking. This training is sometimes regulated and mandated by state and local laws, predominantly in North America, and increasingly in other English-speaking countries such as Australia. In some places, such as Australia, gaining such qualifications is required by law, before one can work to sell alcohol.

The training can be used to mitigate liability during a lawsuit involving intoxication by providing evidence of intent on the part of the establishment that serves and sells alcoholic beverages – a "reasonable efforts defense." This training is intended to lower liquor liability insurance premiums, offer compliance with local laws and regulations, reduce penalties for alcohol violations, and is thought to prevent alcohol-related crimes such as property damage and assault. 

This training can be delivered in the classroom by certified trainers or via a web-based eLearning program.  Most providers or states are able to offer either option. The training can be anywhere from 2 to 6 hours depending on the course content and provider.  The majority of programs will have a certification attached to it where the participant is required to complete an assessment at the end of the training.  In addition, many providers will offer unique programs for the variety of venues where alcohol is served, sold, or consumed.  For example, an Off Premises location (grocery stores, liquor stores, convenience stores) may require unique training compared to an On Premises location (restaurants, bars, hotels, night clubs).  The same is true for stadiums, arenas, amphitheatres, and casinos.

Establishments that train their employees benefit by reducing risk and creating a safer, more responsible work environment.  

Effective training will enhance the fundamental people skills of servers, sellers, and consumers of alcohol.  The training should help individuals understand the difference between people enjoying themselves and those who are getting into trouble with alcohol.  Employees and managers who participate in this training are able to spot underage drinkers and prevent sales to minors, recognize signs of intoxication, effectively intervene to prevent problem situations, and handle refusal situations with greater confidence.

Australia
In Australia, Responsible Service of Alcohol (RSA) training is mandatory nationally for all people selling, offering or serving alcohol, including bar staff, sommeliers, waiting staff, and airline staff.

In Queensland, South Australia, Tasmania and Western Australia this training is delivered by Registered Training Organisations as part of the nationally recognised unit of competency Provide responsible service of alcohol (SITHFAB002). In New South Wales and Victoria, state-specific training is delivered.

Under this strategy, each state government is responsible for putting legislation and strategies in place to minimize the harm alcohol causes to various vulnerable groups in society including minors. One of the ways state governments are enabling this national strategy is through mandatory staff training.

The type of training delivery allowed also varies between states, with states such as Queensland, Western Australia and South Australia and Northern Territory, accepting online delivery of the National RSA training, while Victoria does not currently recognise online as a valid delivery channel for this type of training. In July 2012 the New South Wales government introduced a trial of the NSW course online which was subsequently suspended in February 2014 until changes made to the "integrity of online certification". Debate continues as to the benefits of online training versus classroom training, with advocates claiming it delivers benefits such as more consistent and provides better access to rural learners to deliver the training online, while opponents argue that classroom training delivers better learning outcomes. NSW Update: OLGR NSW have approved a limited number of RTOs to deliver the RSA by email NSW RSA course by "Distance Learning".

Regardless of the delivery channel, RSA training is generally founded on the concept of Duty of care and requires managers and staff to take all reasonable precautions to protect patrons and staff by preventing patrons from becoming disorderly and/or suffering alcohol intoxication. Other topics covered include blood alcohol content, the effects of alcohol on human health, a standard drink, how to serve responsibly and how to refuse service.

New South Wales
In New South Wales, the national training unit is accepted if provided by an RTO approved by Liquor & Gaming New South Wales, however following this training an RSA competency card issued by Service NSW must also be obtained within ninety days.

The RSAT and the L&GNSW RSAT assessments certify you to provide same-day alcohol deliveries to the general public in NSW. From December 1, 2021, to deliver alcohol the same day in NSW, you must have a Liquor & Gaming NSW-issued Certificate of RSAT completion.

Queensland
In Queensland, the national training unit is accepted. The state previously had alternative training requirements, which were replaced by the national standard on 1 July 2013.

Victoria
In Victoria, the Victorian Commission for Gambling and Liquor Regulation (VCGLR) designs and regulates an independent RSA course. To retain currency, a VCGLR-operated online refresher course must be completed every three years. The VCGLR also operates an online bridging course for people holding interstate RSA qualifications, including the national training unit.

Canada
In Canada, alcohol server training is offered for those who serve alcohol and usually security staff and managers to complete relevant training in all provinces and territories. Training requirements and compliance depends on the provincial and territorial authorities who administer each course. The training in each province and territory differs depending on the liquor laws and has different names : Serving It Right (British Columbia), Proserve Program (Alberta), Serve it Right (Saskatchewan), Smart Choices (Manitoba), Smart Serve Ontario (Ontario), Service in Action (Quebec), It’s Good Business: Responsible Service of Alcohol (New Brunswick), It’s Good Business (Nova Scotia), It’s Our Business (Prince Edward Island), It’s Good Business: Responsible Service of Alcohol (Newfoundland and Labrador) and Be a Responsible Server (B.A.R.S) (Yukon)

New Zealand
In New Zealand, the Health Promotion Agency provides optional online training on server obligations under the Sale and Supply of Alcohol Act.

United States
In the United States, this training is taught by a wide range of educational providers.  The cost, quality and content of training varies widely from program to program, state to state, and even jurisdiction to jurisdiction.  The term "alcohol server training", as a consequence, is often an umbrella attached to the overall intent of the training, if nothing else.  This training usually carries some testing and certification, related to local state regulations, but other than the aforementioned few programs are provided nationally.  

Currently, there are 30 states and hundreds of local jurisdictions that regulate alcohol server training.  Each state and jurisdiction regulate the training in different ways.  Some will mandate training, meaning they approve and require specific training by law.  Others will have voluntary training, which means they don't require the training by law but there are specific perks for completing an approved training course.  The remainder are considered non-regulated, which means they do not regulate alcohol server training at all.

References

External links
 State Alcohol Control Board Listing
 Impaired Driving Factsheet
 NIAAA Alcohol Facts and Statistics
 Alcohol Effects

Server training